Royal Liver Assurance  was a friendly society with over 1.7 million members in Ireland and the United Kingdom. Subject to Financial Services Authority (FSA) approval, Royal Liver and its subsidiaries became part of the Royal London Group on 1 July 2011.

History

The Liverpool Lyver Burial Society was founded by a group of working men from Liverpool in the Lyver Inn on 24 July 1850 to "provide for the decent interment of deceased members". By 1857 the Society had moved to its fourth head office and had expanded throughout the United Kingdom. By the end of the 1890s a decision was taken to build what would become the Royal Liver Building; it opened on 19 July 1911.

William Field was a managing director of Royal Livers Friendly Society in 1911.  His Father, John Field, born 1820 was an agent for the Society by 1860. William Field is pictured in the 150-year Commemorate Book put out by the Society. It is believed that one of the pillars of the Royal Liver Building has the family Motto "Fair Field No Favours" on it. William Field died in 1916 while still employed by the Society. It is believed that others of the Field family were also involved with the management of the Society during this time.

During the 20th century, Royal Liver Assurance expanded to cover the whole of Ireland and the UK.

Today, Royal Liver Assurance employs around 900 people, has approximately 3.4 million policies in force for 1.7 million members and manages more than £3.7 billion in funds.

The Royal Liver Assurance has operated a delegation system since 1886; today, there are about 230 or so elected delegates.

The Royal Liver Poetry of Place competition sees schoolchildren write poems about their favourite Liverpool places, which are voted for by the public via the Royal Liver website.

Royal Liver Group
At the time of its acquisition by the Royal London Group in 2011 The Royal Liver Group consisted of:
 Royal Liver Assurance Limited (RLAL), an Incorporated Friendly Society, founded in Liverpool in 1850 for the mutual benefit and financial security of local families. RLAL also traded under the names Progress (in the UK) and Caledonian Life (in Ireland).

RLAL had two subsidiary companies:
 Royal Liver Asset Managers in the UK
 Citadel Financial Advice Limited in Ireland.

Royal Liver previously had a financial advisor company called Park Row, however this was wound up following an investigation by the FSA.

Although owned by Royal Liver, Citadel is an independent company offering financial advice on a wide range of issues and financial services in Ireland.

Takeover

In 2007, Royal London approached Royal Liver about a possible combination of their businesses, but Royal Liver decided to remain as an independent entity.

Since then, however, the financial downturn hit the insurance industry hard. The FSA launched Project Chrysalis, aimed at mutual insurance companies. Companies were asked to hold more capital, and to either stop writing new policies, or justify that continuing selling new business wouldn't put existing policyholders at a disadvantage. At the time, it was anticipated that several mutuals would merge due to lack of capital.

Royal Liver were then approached again by Royal London in February 2010. Talks continued for some time, and the board of Royal Liver agreed the terms of a potential merger in April 2011. The delegates of Royal Liver voted in favour of the merger at the AGM on 12 May 2011. The transfer to Royal London was completed on 1 July 2011.

References

Financial services companies established in 1911
Financial services companies disestablished in 2011
Defunct companies based in Liverpool
Friendly societies of the United Kingdom